Scopula cumulata is a moth of the family Geometridae. It was described by Sergei Alphéraky in 1883. It is found in China and Kyrghyzstan.

Subspecies
Scopula cumulata cumulata (China)
Scopula cumulata alaiana Viidalepp, 1988 (Kyrghyzstan)

References

Moths described in 1883
Moths of Asia
cumulata